

Works
 Jacob van Maerlant's Van der Naturen Bloeme

Births

Deaths

13th-century poetry
Poetry